Nijal Pearson (born November 21, 1997) is an American basketball player for Rostock Seawolves of the German ProA. He competed in college basketball for the Texas State Bobcats.

Early life and high school
Pearson grew up in Beaumont, Texas and attended Central High School. As a senior, he averaged 18.5 points, seven rebounds and nine assists per game and was named the co-District 22-5A MVP and Class 5A All-State by the Texas Association of Basketball Coaches.

College career
Pearson was a starter at small forward for the Bobcats as a true freshman and averaged 13.3 points (second highest on the team), 3.7 rebounds, and 2.4 assists per game. As a sophomore, he led the team with 15.2 points, 6.0 rebounds and 1.3 steals per game and was named to the third team all-Sun Belt Conference. Pearson was named first team All-Sun Belt as a junior after averaging 16.4 points, 5.1 rebounds and 1.4 steals per game. He was named the MVP of the 2018 Portland Classic after scoring 33 point in the championship game against Portland. He became Texas State's all-time leading scorer on January 18, 2020 in a 23-point performance in a win over ULM, breaking Charles Sharp's 60-year-old record of 1,884 points. Pearson scored his 2,000th career point against Georgia Southern on February 20, 2020. Pearson was named the Sun Belt Conference Men's Basketball Player of the Year as a senior. He averaged 19.4 points, 5.4 rebounds, and 2.5 assists per game.

Professional career
In May 2020, Pearson agreed to terms with Chorale Roanne Basket of the LNB Pro A.

On January 30, 2021, he has signed with Lahti Basketball of the Finnish Korisliiga.

On August 19, 2021, he has signed with Rostock Seawolves of the German ProA.

Career statistics

College

|-
| style="text-align:left;"| 2016–17
| style="text-align:left;"| Texas State
| 36 || 36 || 32.8 || .437 || .346 || .721 || 5.7 || 2.4 || 1.4 || .4 || 13.3
|-
| style="text-align:left;"| 2017–18
| style="text-align:left;"| Texas State
| 33 || 32 || 32.6 || .394 || .330 || .709 || 6.0 || 2.4 || 1.3 || .4 || 15.2
|-
| style="text-align:left;"| 2018–19
| style="text-align:left;"| Texas State
| 33 || 33 || 33.2 || .421 || .386 || .690 || 5.1 || 1.4 || 1.4 || .2 || 16.4
|-
| style="text-align:left;"| 2019–20
| style="text-align:left;"| Texas State
| 31 || 31 || 34.9 || .423 || .353 || .772 || 5.4 || 2.5 || 1.3 || .3 || 19.4
|- class="sortbottom"
| style="text-align:center;" colspan="2"| Career
| 133 || 132 || 33.4 || .418 || .356 || .726 || 5.6 || 2.2 || 1.3 || .3 || 16.0

Personal life
Pearson is the son of Stephanie Lartigue-Pearson. He has an older brother, Elijah, while his oldest brother Nico died from testicular cancer in 2010. Pearson's girlfriend is Kayla McNutt. She gave birth to the couple's daughter, Nova Lael Pearson, on February 8, 2020. After playing against Appalachian State in Boone, North Carolina, Pearson took an Uber to Charlotte and took the first flight in the morning to see his newborn girl.

References

External links
Texas State Bobcats bio
College Statistics at Sports-Reference.com
RealGM profile

1997 births
21st-century African-American sportspeople
Living people
African-American basketball players
American expatriate basketball people in Germany
American expatriate basketball people in Finland
American expatriate basketball people in France
American men's basketball players
Basketball players from Texas
Chorale Roanne Basket players
Rostock Seawolves players
Sportspeople from Beaumont, Texas
Texas State Bobcats men's basketball players